The 2019 Hollywood Casino 400 was a Monster Energy NASCAR Cup Series race held on October 20, 2019, at Kansas Speedway in Kansas City, Kansas. Contested over 277 laps—extended from 267 laps due to an overtime finish, on the  intermediate speedway, it was the 32nd race of the 2019 Monster Energy NASCAR Cup Series season, sixth race of the Playoffs, and final race of the Round of 12.

Report

Background

Kansas Speedway is a  tri-oval race track in Kansas City, Kansas. It was built in 2001 and it currently hosts two annual NASCAR race weekends. The Verizon IndyCar Series also raced at here until 2011. The speedway is owned and operated by the International Speedway Corporation.

Entry list
 (i) denotes driver who are ineligible for series driver points.
 (R) denotes rookie driver.

Practice

First practice

Final practice

Qualifying

Qualifying results

Race

Stage results

Stage One
Laps: 80

Stage Two
Laps: 80

Final stage results

Stage Three
Laps: 107

Race statistics
 Lead changes: 15 among 12 different drivers
 Cautions/Laps: 7 for 32
 Red flags: 0
 Time of race: 3 hours, 2 minutes and 39 seconds
 Average speed:

Media

Television
NBC Sports covered the race on the television side. Rick Allen, Jeff Burton, Steve Letarte and Dale Earnhardt Jr. had the call in the booth for the race. Dave Burns, Marty Snider and Kelli Stavast reported from pit lane during the race.

Radio
MRN had the radio call for the race, which was simulcast on Sirius XM NASCAR Radio. Alex Hayden, Jeff Striegle and Rusty Wallace had the call of the race for MRN when the field raced thru the front straightaway. Dave Moody called the race for MRN from Turns 1 &2, and Mike Bagley called the race for MRN from turns 3 &4. Winston Kelley, Steve Post, Kim Coon, and Dillon Welch covered the action for MRN from pit lane.

Standings after the race

Manufacturers' Championship standings

Note: Only the first 16 positions are included for the driver standings.

References

2019 in sports in Kansas
Hollywood Casino 400
NASCAR races at Kansas Speedway
Hollywood Casino 400